Poulton may refer to:

Places in England 
Poulton, Cheshire
RAF Poulton
Poulton-with-Fearnhead, civil parish in Warrington, Cheshire
Poulton, Merseyside, an area of Wallasey
Liscard and Poulton railway station
Poulton, Gloucestershire
Poulton or Poulton Lancelyn, a locality in Bebington, Merseyside
Poulton-le-Fylde, Lancashire
Poulton-le-Sands, the village that became Morecambe, Lancashire

People with the surname 
 Alonzo Poulton, English footballer
 Bruce Poulton (1927–2015), American university administrator
 Diana Poulton (1903–1995), English lutenist
 Edward Bagnall Poulton (1856–1943), British zoologist
 Edward Palmer Poulton (1883–1939), British physician and physiologist
 Ferdinand Poulton (1601–1641), English missionary
 George Poulton (1929–2010), English footballer
 George R. Poulton (1828–1867), English songwriter
 Harry Poulton (born 1919–1981), Canadian sprint canoer
 Henry Mortimer Poulton (1898–1973), administrator in British India
 Jared Poulton (born 1977), Australian footballer
 John Poulton, American engineer
 Leah Poulton (born 1984), Australian cricketer
 Mabel Poulton (1901–1994), British film actress
 Mike Poulton, English translator
 Neil Poulton (born 1963), Scottish designer
 Peter Poulton (born 1970), British radio personality
 Richie Poulton (born 1962), New Zealand psychologist
 Ronald Poulton-Palmer (1889–1915), English rugby player
 Tom Poulton (1897–1963), British magazine and medical illustrator, and erotic artist